Rana Umar Nazir Ahmed Khan (born 9 April 1976) is a Pakistani politician who had been a member of the National Assembly of Pakistan between 1988 and May 2018.

Early life
He was born on 9 April 1976 to Rana Nazeer Ahmed Khan.

Political career
He was elected to the National Assembly of Pakistan as a candidate of Islami Jamhoori Ittehad (IJI) from Constituency NA-78 (Gujranwala-V) in 1988 Pakistani general election. He received 55,019 votes and defeated a candidate of Pakistan Peoples Party (PPP).

He was re-elected to the National Assembly  as a candidate of IJI from Constituency NA-78 (Gujranwala-V) in 1990 Pakistani general election. He received 65,836 votes and defeated a candidate of Pakistan Democratic Alliance (PDA). In September 1991, he was appointed as Minister of State for Cooperative and Forestry in the federal cabinet of Prime Minister  Nawaz Sharif. In January 1992, he was given the additional ministerial portfolio of Minister of State for Population Welfare. He served at both position until July 1993.

He ran for the seat of the National Assembly as a candidate of Pakistan Muslim League (N) (PML-N) from Constituency NA-78 (Gujranwala-V) in 1993 Pakistani general election but was unsuccessful. He received 52,093 votes and lost the seat to a candidate of PPP.

He was re-elected to the National Assembly as a candidate of PML-N from Constituency NA-78 (Gujranwala-V) in 1997 Pakistani general election. He received 69,009 votes and defeated a candidate of PPP.

He was re-elected to the National Assembly as a candidate of Pakistan Muslim League (Q) (PML-Q) from Constituency NA-99 (Gujranwala-V) in 2002 Pakistani general election. He received 62,209 votes and defeated a candidate of PPP.

In 2007, he quit PML-Q to join PML-N.

He ran for the seat of the National Assembly as a candidate of Jamhoori Wattan Party from Constituency NA-99 (Gujranwala-V) in 2008 Pakistani general election but was unsuccessful. He received 690 votes and lost the seat to, his father, Rana Nazeer Ahmed Khan, a candidate of PML-N.

He was re-elected to the National Assembly as a candidate of PML-N from Constituency NA-99 (Gujranwala-V) in 2013 Pakistani general election. He received 97,143 voted and defeated Chaudhry Zulifqar Bhindar, a candidate of PPP.

In May 2018, he quit PML-N and joined Pakistan Tehreek-e-Insaf.

References

Living people
Pakistan Muslim League (N) politicians
Punjabi people
Pakistani MNAs 2013–2018
1976 births
Pakistani MNAs 2002–2007
Pakistani MNAs 1988–1990
Pakistani MNAs 1990–1993
Pakistani MNAs 1997–1999